Aashish Kaul (born July 25) is an Indian television actor, who has been associated with the Indian film and television industry since 1995. He is known for a wide variety of roles in popular Hindi television shows including Ghutan, Kkusum, Kahaani Ghar Ghar Kii, Kasautii Zindagii Kay, C.I.D., Kumkum – Ek Pyara Sa Bandhan, and Ssshhhh...Koi Hai and Barrister Babu . He played the protagonist, Banne Khan, in Afsana Dilwalon Ka, a 2001 Bollywood film directed by J. Om Prakash.

Television

Web

Film

References

Living people
Indian male film actors
Indian male television actors
1963 births
Indian male soap opera actors
Place of birth missing (living people)